New Vogue Children is the debut studio album by Japanese band Schwarz Stein, released in 2003.

The first print of the album came with a limited poster and a special "Message CD" with a spoken message from the band.

Track listing
"the alternation of generations -conception-" (music: Hora) – 0:46
"Release me" (music: Hora, lyrics: Kaya) – 3:46
"Rise to Heaven" (music: Hora, lyrics: Kaya) – 4:20
"Queen of Decadence" (music: Hora, lyrics: Kaya) – 4:07
"transient" (music: Hora, lyrics: Kaya) – 4:54
"Bio Genesis" (music and lyrics: Hora) – 3:45
"fester love" (music and lyrics: Hora) – 4:42
"Succubus" (music: Hora, lyrics: Kaya) – 3:37
"New vogue children" (music: Hora, lyrics: Kaya) – 4:32
"the alternation of generations -increase-" (music: Hora) – 1:03

Personnel
 Kaya - Vocals, lyrics
 Hora - Keyboards, vocals, and programming

References

2003 albums
Schwarz Stein albums